Apoda biguttata, the shagreened slug moth, is a moth of the family Limacodidae. It is found in eastern North America.

The wingspan is 19–30 mm. The moth flies from April to August.

The larvae feed on various deciduous trees, including hornbeam, hickory and oak.

External links
 Bug Guide

Limacodidae
Moths described in 1864
Moths of North America
Taxa named by Alpheus Spring Packard